{{safesubst:#invoke:RfD|||month = March
|day = 20
|year = 2023
|time = 14:34
|timestamp = 20230320143406

|content=
REDIRECT Hero shrine

}}